Wake Up is the final album by the American R&B group Shalamar, released in 1990 on SOLAR. It is the second Shalamar album to include Delisa Davis, Micki Free and Sidney Justin.

In an attempt to keep Shalamar relevant to a contemporary market, the album was heavily influenced by the then-dominant new jack swing style.  Wake Up failed to register on any chart in either the USA or the UK; neither did it produce a charting single in either country. It is Shalamar's least successful album.

Critical reception
The Chicago Tribune wrote that "the surprise entry is a lively reworking of the Beatles' tune 'Come Together'."

Track listing

References

Shalamar albums
1990 albums
SOLAR Records albums